Richard William Battarbee FRS is a British palaeoecologist, and director of the Environmental Change Research Centre, University College London.

Works
Richard W. Battarbee, Heather A. Binney (eds) Natural climate variability and global warming: a Holocene perspective, Wiley-Blackwell, 2008,

References

External links
http://www.geog.ucl.ac.uk/about-the-department/people/emeritus/rick-battarbee
http://www.geog.ucl.ac.uk/about-the-department/a-very-brief-history-of-the-department

British ecologists
Fellows of the Royal Society
Living people
Academics of University College London
Victoria Medal recipients
Year of birth missing (living people)